is a passenger railway station operated by the Takamatsu-Kotohira Electric Railroad in Takamatsu, Kagawa, Japan.  It is operated by the private transportation company Takamatsu-Kotohira Electric Railroad (Kotoden) and is designated station "K04A".

Lines

Layout
The station consists of two opposed elevated side platforms with the station building underneath. The station is staffed.

Platforms

Adjacent stations

History 
Constructing the station was planned as a transport hub by Bureau of Development General Urban Transportation of Takamatsu. Construction of the new station and associated buildings cost . The station was planned to be developed from 2016 to 2019.

The station is located in Ōta-shitamachi, but to avoid confusion, this name was not used, as the adjacent station is Ōta Station. On 11 November 2019 – The station name was determined as "Fuseishi Station" On 28 November 2020 – The station was officially opened.

Surrounding area
Fuseishi Station Bus Terminal
There is a bus terminal, where two route buses that has connected Takamatsu Station with Ritsurin Station and has connected this terminal with Sunmesse East by way of Kagawa University respectively, where an expressway bus route bound for Tokushima Station have used since 6 November 2021.
Japan National Route 11

See also
 List of railway stations in Japan

References

External links

 Official Website

Railway stations in Japan opened in 2020
Railway stations in Takamatsu